The Snowboarding events have been contested at the Universiade since 1995 as optional sport. Since the 1999 became a mandatory sport.

Events

Medalists

Men

Giant slalom

Parallel giant slalom

Parallel slalom

Big Air

Halfpipe

Slopestyle

Snowcross

Women

Giant slalom

Parallel giant slalom

Parallel slalom

Big Air

Halfpipe

Slopestyle

Snowcross

Medal table 
Last updated after the 2023 Winter Universiade

References 
Sports123

 
Universiade
Sports at the Winter Universiade